LCL S.A. is a major French banking network that is part of the Crédit Agricole group, with registered office in Lyon and administrative head office in Paris, France. It was established in 2005 from its predecessor the Crédit Lyonnais, and its name LCL refers to "Le Crédit Lyonnais". As of 2005, it served about 6 million customers in 2000 branches in France.

Controversy 
In 2010 the French government's Autorité de la concurrence (the department in charge of regulating competition) fined eleven French banks, including LCL S.A., the sum of 384,900,000 euros for colluding to charge unjustified fees on check processing, especially for extra fees charged during the transition from paper check transfer to "Exchanges Check-Image" electronic transfer.

See also 

 Crédit Agricole
 Crédit Lyonnais

References

External links
 LCL (Le Crédit Lyonnais)

Investment banks
Primary dealers
Companies based in Lyon
Privatized companies of France
Crédit Agricole subsidiaries